Marcela Valeria Britos (born February 26, 1985 in Maldonado) is a Uruguayan track and field athlete, who specialized in middle distance running. She represented Uruguay at the 2008 Summer Olympics in Beijing, and competed in the women's 800 metres. She ran in the third heat of the event, against six other athletes, including Kenya's Pamela Jelimo, who eventually became an Olympic champion in the final. Britos finished the race in last place, with a time of 2:08.98, but was upgraded to sixth position in this heat, when Croatia's Vanja Perišić had been disqualified for failing the doping test.

References

External links
 
 NBC 2008 Olympics profile

Uruguayan female middle-distance runners
Living people
Olympic athletes of Uruguay
Athletes (track and field) at the 2008 Summer Olympics
1985 births
South American Games silver medalists for Uruguay
South American Games medalists in athletics
Competitors at the 2006 South American Games